Mount Hope is a neighbourhood in Hamilton, Ontario, Canada. It is part of the former town of Glanbrook. The John C. Munro Hamilton International Airport and the Canadian Warplane Heritage Museum are located in Mount Hope.

References

Designated places in Ontario
Neighbourhoods in Hamilton, Ontario